Saqsa (Quechua for multi-colored, also spelled Sacsa) is a mountain in the Andes of Peru, about  high. It is situated in the Lima Region, Huarochirí Province, Huanza District. Saqsa lies between two lakes named Saqsaqucha and P'itiqucha, southwest of P'iti and northeast of Qullqi and Uyshu.

References 

Mountains of Peru
Mountains of Lima Region